Hans Podlipnik Castillo and Andrei Vasilevski were the defending champions but chose not to defend their title.

Gerard Granollers and Lukáš Rosol won the title after defeating Nikola Čačić and Lucas Miedler 7–5, 6–3 in the final.

Seeds

Draw

References
 Main Draw

Tilia Slovenia Open - Doubles
2018 Doubles